Kwame Danso is a town in the Bono East Region of Ghana. The town is known for the Kwame Danso Senior High Technical School.  The school is a second cycle institution. The town was formerly called Donkore.

References

Populated places in the Bono East Region